The Weekendavisen Book Award is an annual literary award presented by the Danish newspaper Weekendavisen. The nominees are selected om December by Weekendavisen's corps of literary critics and the final winner is selected by the readers. The ceremony takes place in January the following year.

Recipients
 1980:  Suzanne Brøgger for Brøg
 1981: Marie Hammer for Forsker i fem verdensdele
 1982: Villy Sørensen for Ragnarok
 1983: Jørgen Christian Hansen for Knæleren
 1984: Poul Behrendt for Bissen og dullen
 1985: Anna Sophie Seidelin for Genfortælling af det nye testamente
 1986: Bent William Rasmussen for En dag i Amerika
 1987: Peter Bastian for Ind i musikken
 1988: Peter Høeg for Forestilling om det tyvende århundrede
 1989: Ib Michael for Kilroy Kilroy
 1990: Peter Seeberg for Rejsen til Ribe
 1991: Søren Ulrik Thomsen for Hjemfalden
 1992: Birgitte Possing for Natalie Zahle. Viljens styrke
 1993: Benny Andersen for Denne kommen og gåen
 1994: Pia Tafdrup for Territorialsang
 1995: Peter Schepelern for Filmleksikon
 1996: Bettina Heltberg for Hvor der handles
 1997: Knud Sørensen for En tid
 1998: Anne Marie Løn for Dværgenes dans
 1999: Hans Edvard Nørregård-Nielsen for Mands minde
 2000: Joakim Garff for SAK
 2001: Kristian Ditlev Jensen for Det bliver sagt
 2002: Bent Jensen for  Gulag og glemsel
 2003:  for Andersen – en biografi
 2004:  for Danmarks oldtid
 2005: Jørgen Leth for Det uperfekte menneske
 2006: Knud Romer for Den som blinker er bange for døden
 2007: Jens Smærup Sørensen for Mærkedage
 2008: Mikkel Kirkebæk for Schalburg – en patriotisk landsforræder
 2009: Anne Lise Marstrand-Jørgensen for Hildegard
 2010: Birgithe Kosovic for Det dobbelte land
 2011 Erik Valeur for Det syvende barn
 2012: Kim Leine for Profeterne i Evighedsfjorden
 2013: Yahya Hassan for Digte
 2014: Tom Buk-Swienty for Kaptajn Dinesen - Til døden os skiller
 2015: Pia Fris Laneth for 1915. Da kvinder og tyende blev borgere
 2016: Flemming Rose for De besatte
 2017: Naja Marie Aidt for Har døden taget noget fra dig, så giv det tilbage - Carls bog
 2018: Niels Brunse for Shakespeares samlede skuespil I-VI (translation)
 2019 Jeanette Varberg: for Viking. Ran, ild og sværd
 2020 Stine Pilgaard: for Meter i sekundet
 2021 Rakel Haslund-Gjerrild for Adam i Paradis

References

Danish literary awards
Weekendavisen
Literary awards by magazines and newspapers
Awards established in 1980
1980 establishments in Denmark